Jamara Forest Park is a forest park in the Gambia. It covers 579 hectares.

It is located in Central River, the estimate terrain elevation above sea level is 19 metres.

References

Forest parks of the Gambia